The WEY Mocha or WEY Coffee 01 is a mid-size luxury crossover SUV produced by Great Wall Motor under the premium brand, WEY.

Overview

The Mocha was presented in January 2021. Sales started in April 2021 at Auto Shanghai in the Mainland Chinese market. The SUV is named after the mocha coffee. With the Latte and the Macchiato, two other vehicles of the brand named after coffee specialties were also presented at Auto Shanghai.

At the market launch, the  SUV was only available with a  two-liter gasoline engine. A plug-in hybrid version with an electric range of around 200 km is to follow later.

The Mocha is also known as the Coffee 01 in European markets.

References

External links
Official website in Chinese

Mocha
Crossover sport utility vehicles
Mid-size sport utility vehicles
Plug-in hybrid vehicles
Front-wheel-drive vehicles
All-wheel-drive vehicles
Cars introduced in 2021
Cars of China